Badin Tehsil is an administrative subdivision (Tehsil) of Badin District in the Sindh province of Pakistan. It is administratively subdivided into 12 union councils, three of which form the district capital Badin. Nindo Shaher is one of the union councils of Badin Taluka.

References

Talukas of Sindh
Populated places in Badin District
Tehsils of Sindh